The 1936 Detroit Tigers season was a season in American baseball. The team finished second in the American League with a record of 83–71, 19½ games behind the New York Yankees.

Offseason 
 December 10, 1935: Al Simmons was purchased by the Tigers from the Chicago White Sox for $75,000.

Regular season

Season standings

Record vs. opponents

Roster

Player stats

Batting

Starters by position 
Note: Pos = Position; G = Games played; AB = At bats; H = Hits; Avg. = Batting average; HR = Home runs; RBI = Runs batted in

Other batters 
Note: G = Games played; AB = At bats; H = Hits; Avg. = Batting average; HR = Home runs; RBI = Runs batted in

Pitching

Starting pitchers 
Note: G = Games pitched; IP = Innings pitched; W = Wins; L = Losses; ERA = Earned run average; SO = Strikeouts

Other pitchers 
Note: G = Games pitched; IP = Innings pitched; W = Wins; L = Losses; ERA = Earned run average; SO = Strikeouts

Relief pitchers 
Note: G = Games pitched; W = Wins; L = Losses; SV = Saves; ERA = Earned run average; SO = Strikeouts

Awards and honors

League records 
Charlie Gehringer, American League record, most doubles in one season by a second baseman (60)

Farm system 

LEAGUE CHAMPIONS: Milwaukee, Alexandria, Tiffin

Notes

External links 

1936 Detroit Tigers season at Baseball Reference

Detroit Tigers seasons
Detroit Tigers season
Detroit Tigers
1936 in Detroit